Scott Atkinson (July 23, 1966 – February 26, 2021) was an American actor and screenwriter from Pennsylvania best known for his many television roles, including recurring roles on Desperate Housewives, The Jamie Foxx Show, Commander in Chief, Providence, NYPD Blue, and Lincoln Heights, along with notable guest roles on Frasier as Daphne's boyfriend Clive and Mad About You as Doug the Handyman. He was also known for several film roles and his screenwriting credits.

Career 
His television roles include recurring roles and multi-episode arcs on The Jamie Foxx Show (as Hawkins in Season 4), Commander in Chief (Reporter Steve in Season 1), Providence (Bill Graff in Season 3), NYPD Blue (Steve McClintock in Season 12), Lincoln Heights (Detective Briggs in Season 1), and a recurring role as a police officer in four episodes of Desperate Housewives, one per season for the first four seasons.

Other notable roles include Doug the handyman in Mad About You, a love interest of Caroline Duffy's in Caroline in the City, and Paul's sponsor, Bob Hicks, in Season 1 of Dexter. He also played Tony in the Columbo movie "Murder with Too Many Notes" (2001) and Rick Danish in Arrested Development.

He had guest starring roles on many other shows, including: George & Leo, Cupid, The Secret Diary of Desmond Pfeiffer, JAG,The Pretender, Crossing Jordan, The King of Queens, and more.

He is also well known for playing Daphne's ex-fiance, Clive, on Frasier in one of the show's most famous episodes, "The Two Mrs. Cranes", which was also the premiere episode of Season 4. Atkinson's performance, most notably the accent he employed, caused some controversy and is still discussed among fans and even in an academic journal! The writer of the episode, Joe Keenan, said he had heard such criticisms "for over a decade" (at that time) and defended the performance, penning a piece on why Atkinson was the right choice for the role. Keenan said: "The part of Clive had three main requirements: the actor had to be funny, he had to be handsome enough for us to believe that Roz and Daphne would instantly go to war over him, and he had to be (or at least play) English." They auditoned eight actors, half of whom were actually British. They felt none of the Brits were either funny or sexy enough to make the storyline work. "Scott, a handsome and charming American, came in and read the part under the apparent impression that the role was based on Hugh Grant," Keenan went on. They explained to him that the Clive character was working class so Atkinson took a few minutes to prepare and returned with a working class accent that they felt was a bit broad but good enough for American ears. Keenan finished by saying: "Had we cast any of our choices save Scott we'd have torpedoed the whole episode." Since these comments and with the passage of time, the performance has been reappraised.

In film, he played Dr. Bradley Bradley in the movie Elvira's Haunted Hills (2001) and Chester Baer in The Mostly Unfabulous Social Life of Ethan Green (2005). Other film roles include the HBO movie The Second Civil War (1997), The Unknown Cyclist (1998), Mothers of the Bride (2015), The Wrong House (2016), Path to War (2002), The Debtors (1999), and Windtalkers (2002).

Atkinson was also a screenwriter. He and his husband, Tegan West, were writing partners. They wrote the screenplay of Duck Duck Goose, and had also written a movie called "Honeymoon with Dad" to be directed by Danny DeVito, had another script optioned called "Minimum Wage" to be helmed by Mark Waters, and planned another project about Irish senator David Norris. All these planned projects received media attention and announcements.

Personal life and death 
Atkinson graduated from Franklin & Marshall College in Lancaster, Pennsylvania in 1988.

He was married to actor Tegan West.

Scott Atkinson died in Palm Springs, California, on February 26, 2021. He was friends with Cassandra Peterson (aka Elvira), who first reported his passing, noting that "he was survived by the great love of his life Tegan West, his mother Pearl, his sister Kelly, and his dog Sergeant."

Novelist, dramatist, and Frasier writer Joe Keenan also paid tribute to Atkinson, noting that in his appearance on the show "he more than held his own as a sweet, credulous guy bombarded by self-serving lies. Without his skill & charm, none of it would have worked. RIP to a dear man."

References

External links 
 
 

1966 births
2021 deaths
20th-century American male actors
21st-century American male actors
American gay actors
Male actors from Pennsylvania